Saladınlı (also, Saladynly) is a village and the least populous municipality in the Tovuz Rayon of Azerbaijan.  It has a population of 126. It is located in the Northeastern region of Azerbaijan.

References 

Populated places in Tovuz District